Tournament of Champions is a national high school debate tournament held at the University of Kentucky every year in late April. To qualify, debaters need at least two bids or automatically qualify by placing high enough at last year's Tournament of Champions.

Policy Debate Champions and Runner Ups

1972: Marquette University High School – Jeff Clark & Mark Foley; Marquette University High School – Mark Miner & David Dries
1973: Hillsboro – Mary Thomson & Kather Zickert; Upper Arlington – Peter Koeniz & Doug Dougherty
1974: Walter Panas – Denise Gilbert & Larry Falkin; Wilkinsburg – John Tumazos & David Snowball
1975: Cardinal Spellman – Leo Gagion & John Bredehoft; Lakeland – Amy Davidoff & Virginia Raymond
1976: Cardinal Spellman – Leo Gagion & John Bredehoft; Soquel – Ron Aitken & Jeff Lorenzen
1977: Lake Forest (IL) – Karen Albrecht & Hugh Abrams; Robinson – Michael Laurence & Shelly Coleman
1978: Walter Panas – Donna Gilbert & Patrick O'Neill; Bronx High School of Science (NY) – Eric Raps & Matthew Mandell
1979: Bronx High School of Science (NY) – Andrew Berman & Herschel Goldfield; Marquette University High School – Jim Boehner & John Barrett
1980: Glenbrook North (IL) – Jeff Wagner & Brad Malis; Bronx High School of Science (NY) – Stuart Weich & Andrew Berman
1981: Glenbrook South (IL) – Ryan Fought & Duncan Kloiber; Firestone – Alan Gerber & Steve Dist
1982: Oak Park & River Forest (IL) – Todd Martin & Eric Brackett; Glenbrook North (IL) – Peter Braverman & Ken Karas
1983: Oak Park & River Forest (IL) – Macklin Trimnell & C.V. Doherty ;Creighton Prep – Wally Mullin & Don Erftmier, Jr.
1984: Lake Braddock – Shaun Martin & Mike Green; New Trier (IL) – Laura Michaelis & Moria McDermott
1985: Lake Braddock – Joe Pettit & Mike Green; Marquette University High School – Ed Lynch & Kevin Roe
1986: Albany – Peter Gross & Andrew Schrank; Bishop Guertin (NH) – Pete Klamka & Tim Pramas
1987: Manchester – Sarah Gannett & Zach Leber; Stuyvesant (NY) – Hanna Rosin & David Coleman
1988: Downers Grove South (IL) – Karrie Schwartz & Bill Fick; Bronx High School of Science (NY) – Josh Brumberg & Noah Millman
1989: St. Mark's School of Texas (TX) – Steven Sklaver & Jack Stroube; Richmond Kennedy – Colin Kahl & Todd Cort
1990: Oak Park & River Forest (IL) – Eric Truett & Brian Ruder; Harvard School – Ara Lovitt & Ahilan Arulanantham
1991: Omaha Westside (NE) – Paul Skiermont & Jason Patil; Georgetown Day School (DC) – Daniel Nexon & Rebecca Tushnet
1992: Edgemont (NY) – Jason Feldman & Derek Schaffer; Albuquerque Academy (NM) – Jeremy Pena & Mark Kutny
1993: Isidore Newman School (LA) – Ben Norwood & Taavi Reiss; Brookfield Central (WI) – David Frank & Joshua Heling
1994: Lexington (MA) – Li-Cheng Wang & Steve Lehotsky; Edgemont (NY) – Sanket Bulsara & Chris Lennon
1995: Niles West (IL) – Armands Revelins & George Kouros; Lexington (MA) – Steve Lehotsky & Matt Nichols
1996: Glenbrook North (IL) – Larry Heftman & Adam Hurder; Katy-Taylor (TX)- Jeff McNabb & Kim Sikora
1997: Caddo Magnet (LA) – Andy Ryan & Kamal Ghali; Greenhill (TX) – Josh Goldberg & Rashad Hussain
1998: Glenbrook South (IL) – Adam Goldstein & Todd Fine; Greenhill (TX) – Caitlin Talmadge & Andrew Bradt
1999: Montgomery Bell Academy (TN) – Raja Gaddipati/Robbie Quinn; Lexington (MA) – Josh Lynn & Yoni Cohen
2000: Greenhill School (TX) – Asher Haig/Jordan Pietzsch; Centerville (OH) – Caleb Liang & Henry Liu
2001: Glenbrook North (IL) – Michael Klinger/Stacey Nathan; Woodward Academy (GA) – Avery Dale and Peter Miller
2002: Pace Academy (GA) – Bob Allen/Brian Smith; St. Mark's School of Texas (TX) Josh Branson/Michael Martin
2003: The College Preparatory School (CA) – Michael Burshteyn/Eli Anders; Greenhill School (TX) – Maggie Ahn & Saad Hussain
2004: Glenbrook North (IL) – Jake Ziering/Michael Rosecrans; College Preparatory School (CA) – Michael Burshteyn/Eli Anders
2005: The Westminster Schools (GA) – Anusha Deshpande/Stephen Weil; Chattahoochee (GA) – Garrett Abelkop/John Warden
2006: Greenhill School (TX) – Mathew Andrews/Stephen Polley; Glenbrook South (IL) – Abe Corrigan/Mima Lazarevic
2007: Glenbrook North (IL) – Matt Fisher/Stephanie Spies; The Westminster Schools (GA) – Stephen Weil/Sanjena Anshu Sathian
2008: Greenhill School (TX) – Nicholas Rogan and Olivia Rogan; Colleyville Heritage(TX) – James Hamraie and Evan Defillipis
2009: The Westminster Schools (GA) – Sanjena Anshu Sathian/Rajesh Jegadeesh; Bellarmine College Prep (CA) – Will Rafey/Sagar Vijay
2010: The Westminster Schools (GA) – Ellis Allen/Daniel Taylor; St. Mark's School of Texas (TX) – Alex Miles/Rishee Batra
2011: The Westminster Schools (GA) – Ellis Allen/Daniel Taylor; Lexington (MA) – Arjun Vellayappan/Tyler Engler
2012: Iowa City West High School (IA) – Jeffrey Ding/Liam Hancock; Glenbrook North (IL) – Rachel Boroditsky/Nathaniel Sawyer
2013: C. K. McClatchy High School (CA) – John Spurlock/Keenan Harris; Glenbrook North (IL) – Natalie Knez/Nathaniel Sawyer
2014: Centennial High School (MD) – Gabriel Koo/Michael Koo; Polytechnic High School (CA) – Julia Alison/Les Asimow
2015: The Westminster Schools (GA) – Saul Forman/Naman Gupta; Baltimore City College (MD) – Peymaan Motevalli/Joseph Gaylin
2016: Highland Park (MN) – Dan Bannister/Ian Dill; Little Rock Central (AR) – Payton Woods/Darrin Williams
2017: McDonogh (MD) –  Ryan James/Nishad Neelakandan; Peninsula (CA) – Raam Tambe/Jerry Wang
2018: Monta Vista (CA) – Rafael Pierry/Dhruv Sudesh; Blue Valley Southwest (KS) – Danish Khan/Stephen Lowe
2019: North Broward Prep (FL) – Nicholas Mancini/Giorgio Rabbini; Montgomery Bell Academy (TN) – Aden Barton/Julian Habermann
2020: Montgomery Bell Academy (TN) – Aden Barton/Sam Meacham; Whitney M. Young Magnet High School (IL) – Jeremy Margolin/Henry Mitchell
2021: Bellarmine College Preparatory (CA) – Adarsh Hiremath/Surya Midha; Chaminade College Preparatory (CA) - Dhruv Ahuja/Azi Hormozdiari
2022: Lawrence Free State (KS) – John Marshall/Serena Rupp; Berkeley Preparatory (FL) – Kyle Shah/Antonio Souchet

Lincoln Douglas Debate Champions and Runner Ups
1986: Hee-Sun Hong – The Bronx High School of Science (NY) ; Greg Hewett – Jenks High School (OK)
1987: Scott Tucker – Twin Lakes High School (FL) ; Craig Tinsky – Miami Palmetto High School (FL)
1988: Jonathan Koppell and Peter Colavito – The Bronx High School of Science (NY) – Close-out
1989: David Kennedy – Regis High School (NY) ; Amy Forsee – Homewood High School
1990: Chris Kellner – Tampa Jesuit High School (FL) ; Arthur Chu – Albuquerque Academy (NM)
1991: Jeff Marcus – Miami Palmetto High School (FL) ; Bill Harrington – Regis High School (NY)
1992: Michael Erickson – La Cueva High School (NM);Jason Baldwin – Vestavia Hills High School (AL)
1993: Jason Baldwin – Vestavia Hills High School (AL) ; Carlos Gonzales – Christopher Columbus High School (FL)
1994: Ann Miura – Palo Alto High School (CA) ; Claire Carman – Vestavia Hills High School (AL)
1995: Greg Goldfarb – Miami Palmetto High School (FL) ; Tyrenda Williams – Vestavia Hills High School (AL)
1996: Courtney Balentine – Valley High School (IA) ; David Singh – Apple Valley High School (MN)
1997: Hetal Doshi – Vestavia Hills High School (AL) ; Brian Fletcher – Valley High School (IA)
1998: Ari Simon – Valley High School (IA); Anna Manasco – St. James School (AL)
1999: Tom Zimpleman – Valley High School (IA); Ben Davidson – Vestavia Hills High School (AL)
2000: Seamus Donovan – Edmond North High School (OK); James Scott – Katy High School (TX)
2001: Tom Pryor – Hopkins High School (MN); Tommy Clancy – Westwood High School (TX)
2002: Jenn Larson – Millard West High School (NE); Kelsey Olson – Apple Valley High School (MN)
2003: Andrew Garvin – Mission San Jose High School (CA); Tom Evnen – Lincoln Southeast High School (NE)
2004: John McNeil – Edina High School (MN); Tim Hogan – Apple Valley High School (MN)
2005: David Wolfish – Greenhill School (TX); Hirsh Jain – Mission San Jose (CA)
2006: Stephen Hess – Mountain View High School (CA); David Weeks, Highland Park High School (TX)
2007: Patrick Diehl – Lynbrook High School (CA); David McGough – Greenhill School (TX)
2008: Chris Theis – Apple Valley High School (MN); Becca Traber Kinkaid HS (TX)
2009: Chris Theis – Apple Valley High School (MN); Daniel Moerner, Mountain View / Los Altos (CA)
2010: Catherine Tarsney – St. Louis Park High School (MN); Ross Brown, Valley High School (IA)
2011: Larry Liu and Jeffrey Liu – Indian Springs School (AL) – Close-out
2012: Noah Star – Lexington High School (MA); Bob Overing – Loyola High School (Los Angeles) (CA)
2013: Rebecca Kuang – Greenhill School (TX); Richard Shmikler – Saint Louis Park High School (MN)
2014: Danny DeBois – Harrison High School (NY); Chris Kymn – Loyola High School (CA)
2015: Pranav Reddy – The Harker School (CA); David Branse – University School (FL)
2016: Nick Steele – Harvard-Westlake (CA); Felix Tan – Clements (CA)
2017: Parker Whitfill – Phoenix Country Day (AZ); Nina Potischman – Hunter College (NY)
2018: Brian Zhou – Greenhill (TX); Rex Evans – Santa Monica (CA)
2019: Ishan Bhatt – St. Andrew's Episcopal (MS); Jaya Nayar – Harvard Westlake (CA)
2020: Evan Li – Lexington High School (MA); Animesh Joshi – Valley High School (IA)
2021: Zion Dixon – Strake Jesuit College Preparatory (TX); Andrew Gong – Harvard-Westlake (CA)
2022: Max Perin – Sage Hill (CA); Anshul Reddy – Harker (CA)

Public Forum Debate Champions and Runner Ups
2004: Jay M. Robinson HS (NC) – Erin Lopez/Jordan Myers; Nova HS (FL) – Alexandra Wall/Natalia Rigol
2005: Albuquerque Academy (NM) – Hollie Putnam/Heather Campbell; Torrey Pines (CA) – Eric Carino/Ian Hampton
2006: Manchester-Essex (MA) – James Pates/Dan Cellucci; Manchester-Essex (MA) – Ross Cowman/Ryan Swanzey (Co-Champions)
2007: Lexington (MA) – Chrissy Kugel/Garth Goldwater; Durham Academy (NC) – Patrick Toomey/Katherine Buse
2008: North Allegheny (PA) – Naz El-Khatib/Claire Kairys; The Collegiate School (NY) – Charles Giardina/Jonathan Yip
2009: Harker School (CA) – Kelsey Hilbrich/Kaavya Gowda; Walt Whitman High School (MD) – Alex Edelman/Aaron Schifrin
2010: George Washington High School (CO) – Gabe Rusk/Brendan Patrick; Ridge High School (NJ) – Brian Moore/Tejus Pradeep
2011: The Harker School (CA) – Aakash Jagadeesh/Frederic Enea ; Lake Highland Preparatory School (FL) – Grant Sinnot/Jake Bayer
2012: Florida University School (FL) – Dalton Feeley/Daniel Rego ; Walt Whitman High School (MD) – Fionn Adamian/Ben Zimmermann
2013: Pine View School (FL) – Arjun Byju/Mark Allseits ; Ransom Everglades School (FL) – Jacob Stern/ Megan Mers
2014: Walt Whitman High School (MD) – Fionn Adamian/Ben Zimmermann; Walt Whitman High School (MD) – Samuel Arnesen/William Arnesen
2015: Walt Whitman High School (MD) – Samuel Arnesen/William Arnesen; Ridge High School (NJ) – Tim O'Shea/Oliver Tang
2016: Pine View School (FL) – Aravind Byju/Sho Szczepaniuk; Mission San Jose High School (CA) – Max Wu/Keshav Kundassery
2017: the Nueva School (CA) – Jake Mengarelli/Matthew Salah; the Blake School (MN) – Ellie Grossman/Connor Yu
2018: Newton South (MA) – Jay Garg/Anika Sridhar; Walt Whitman High School(MD) – Elisa McCartin/Rabhya Mehrotra
2019: The Blake School (MN) – Thomas Gill/Jack Johnson; Lincoln-Sudbury (MA) – Daniel Cigale/Sandeep Shankar
2020: The Blake School (MN) – Morgan Swigert/Jack Johnson; Westlake (TX) – Miles Dintzner/Jason Luo
2021: The Dalton School (NY) – Jj Yu/Rebecca Solomon; University School (OH) – Ananth Menon/Marcus Novak
2022: Brentwood High School (TN) - William Hong/Sully Mrkva; Strake Jesuit College Preparatory (TX) - Ishan Dubey/Ben Goldin

Congressional Debate Champions
2002: Kristen Soltis – Cypress Creek (FL)
2003: Josh Swartsel – Lake Highland Prep (FL)
2004: Matt Turetzky – Nova High School (FL)
2005: Matt Cynamon – Nova High School (FL)
2006: Cameron Secord – Brookwood High School (GA)
2007: Michael Educate – Lake Forest High School (IL)
2008: Ben Berkman – Nova High School (FL)
2009: Joseph Perretta – Christopher Columbus High School (FL)
2010: Alex Smyk – Ridge High School (NJ)
2011: Rylan Schaeffer – Mountain View High School (CA)
2012: Gregory Bernstein – Nova High School (FL)
2013: Gregory Bernstein – Nova High School (FL)
2014: Will Mascaro – Hawken School (OH)
2015: Azhar Hussain – Southlake Carroll (TX)
2016: Katherine Kleinle – Ridge (NJ)
2017: Mohammad Naeem – Western (FL)
2018: Nicholas DeVito – Poly Prep (NY)
2019: Ranen Miao – Millburn (NJ)
2020: Rohit Jhawar – John F. Kennedy High School (CA)
 Champion Presiding Officer: Manu Onteeru – Thomas Jefferson HSST (VA)
2021: Andrew Sun – The Harker School (CA)
 Champion Presiding Officer: Joshua Hansen – Jackson Hole (WY) 
2022: Anish Beeram — Saint Mary’s Hall (TX)
Champion Presiding Officer: Zachary Wu — Naperville North High School (IL)

Extemporaneous Speaking Champions
2013: Lillian Nellans - Des Moines Roosevelt (IA)
2014: Miles Saffran - Trinity Preparatory School (FL)
2015: Brian Anderson - LaRue County High School (KY)
2016: Justin Graham - Trinity Preparatory School (FL)
2017: Jacob Thompson - Theodore Roosevelt High School (IA)
2018: Nikhil Ramaswamy - Plano West Senior High School (TX)
2019: Katherine Rollins - Potomac School (VA)
2020: Katherine Rollins - Potomac School (VA)
2021: Katherine Rollins - Potomac School (VA)

Original Oratory Champions
2013: Nader Helmy - Apple Valley High School (MN)
2014: Stephanie Bernstein - Nova High School (FL)
2015: Lane Hedrick - Rowan County (KY)
2016: Eve Moll - St. Thomas Aquinas High School (FL)
2017: JJ Kapur - West Des Moines Valley (IA)
2018: Noemi Rivera - Royse City High School (TX)
2019: Avi Gulati - Harker School (CA)
2020: Katherine Rollins - Potomac School (VA)
2021: Jihan Abdi - Apple Valley High School (MN)

Dramatic Interpretation Champions
2015: Kella Merlain-Moffatt - Oxbridge Academy (CA)
2016: Craig Heyne - Nova High School (FL)
2017: Kimberly Lee - Summit High School (NJ)
2018: Camilla Maionica - NSU University School (FL)
2019: Caitlyn Woitena - J. Frank Dobie High School (TX)
2020: Elizabeth Lopez-Aguilar - Alief Early College High School (TX)
2021: Prem Ganesan - Wayzata High School (MN)

Duo Interpretation Champions
2015: Berger and Heyne - Nova High School (FL)
2016: Diaz and Ramirez - Spring Woods High School (TX)
2017: Fu and Tran - Fullerton Union High School (CA)
2018: Cosman and Wurtenberger - Cypress Bay High School (FL)
2019: Pai and Sasane - Ridge High School (NJ)
2020: Event did not occur
2021: Michaelson and Walton - Apple Valley High School (MN)

Humorous Interpretation Champions
2015: Craig Heyne - Nova High School (FL)
2016: Craig Heyne - Nova High School (FL)
2017: Jacob Lieberman - Nova High School (FL)
2018: Alexia Cosman - Cypress Bay High School (FL)
2019: Tanner Hemmingsen - George Washington High School (CO)
2020: Abigail Canalejo - American Heritage Plantation (FL)
2021: Reeya Kansra - Shrewsbury High School (MA)

Oral Interpretation Champions
2015: Zenita Collie - Nova High School (FL)
2016: Craig Heyne - Nova High School (FL)
2017: Sterling Wertanzl - Cypress Bay High School (FL)
2018: Anjini Mathur - Ridge High School (NJ)
2019: Jack Neel - Bethlehem High School (KY)
2020: Jaina Jallow - Livingston High School (NJ)
2021: Joshua Timmons - Greenhill School (TX)

Program Oral Interpretation Champions
2017: Haleigh McGirt - Jupiter High School (FL)
2018: Steele Schoeberl - Lift Academy (MI)
2019: Elise Little - Chaparral Star Academy (TX)
2020: Sophia Williams - Miramar High School (FL)
2021: Joshua Timmons - Greenhill School (TX)

Informative Speaking Champions
2018: Jordyn Allen - American Heritage (FL)
2019: Yucheng Lou - American Heritage Plantation (FL)
2020: Selina Chen - Saratoga High School (CA)
2021: Ceceilia Voss - Apple Valley High School

References

North American debating competitions